Panaeolus papilionaceus var. parvisporus is a little brown mushroom that grows in horse or cow dung and is in the genus Panaeolus.

Description

The cap is up to 5 cm across, grayish brown, not hygrophanous, conic to campanulate in age.  The cap margin is not adorned with remnants of the partial veil. The stem is 10 cm by 2.5 mm, fibrous and pruinose. The gills are adnexed and close, with one or two tiers of intermediate gills.

Some collections are allegedly mildly psychoactive, containing psilocybin.

Edibility
Though neither particularly choice in flavor nor substantial in mass,  it is nonetheless edible. No member of the genus Panaeolus is known to be toxic.

References

External links
 Observations on Mushroom Observer

papilionaceus var. parvisporus